Kauhajoki Airfield  is an aerodrome located in Kauhajoki, Finland, about  east-northeast of Kauhajoki centre.

Facilities

See also
 List of airports in Finland

References

External links
 VFR Suomi/Finland – Kauhajoki Airfield
 Lentopaikat.net – Kauhajoki Airfield 
 Town of Kauhajoki – Kauhajoki Airfield 

Airports in Finland
Airfield
Buildings and structures in South Ostrobothnia